Aleksandar Vidović (born 12 May 2001) is a Bosnian professional footballer who plays as a left-back for FK Spartak Subotica in the Serbian SuperLiga.

Club career
Born in Milići, Bosnia and Herzegovina, part of Republika Srpska entity, he started his career in Serbia with youth team of FK Spartak Subotica, where he debuted for the senior team at the 2019–20 Serbian SuperLiga.

References

2001 births
Living people
People from Milići
Association football midfielders
Bosnia and Herzegovina footballers
FK Spartak Subotica players
Serbian SuperLiga players
Bosnia and Herzegovina expatriate footballers
Expatriate footballers in Serbia
Bosnia and Herzegovina expatriate sportspeople in Serbia